The Froissart–Stora equation describes the change in polarization which a high energy charged particle beam in a storage ring will undergo
as it passes through a resonance in the spin tune.
 It is named after the French physicists Marcel Froissart and Raymond Stora.
The polarization following passage through the resonance is given by

The resonance may be crossed by raising the energy so that the spin tune passes through a resonance, or driven with a transverse magnetic field at a frequency that is in resonance with the spin oscillations.

The Froissart–Stora equation has a direct analogy in condensed matter physics in the Landau–Zener effect.

Other spin-dynamics effects
The original Froissart–Stora equation was derived for polarized protons.  It may also be applied to polarized electrons in storage rings.  In this case, there are additional polarization effects resulting from the synchrotron radiation.  In particular, the Sokolov–Ternov effect describes the polarization due to spin flip radiation.  In the case of a non-planar ring, this must be generalized as was done by Derbenev and Kondratenko.

Notes

Accelerator physics
Quantum mechanics
Equations of physics